Johan Danielsson (born 30 June 1982) is a Swedish trade unionist and politician of the Social Democratic Party who has been serving as Minister for Housing and Deputy Minister for Employment in cabinet of Prime Minister Magdalena Andersson since 30 November 2021.

Political career
Danielsson was elected into the European Parliament in the 2019 elections. In parliament, he served on the Committee on Transport and Tourism. In addition to his committee assignments, he was part of the Parliament's delegation for Northern cooperation and for relations with Switzerland and Norway and to the EU-Iceland Joint Parliamentary Committee and the European Economic Area (EEA) Joint Parliamentary Committee. He was replaced in the European Parliament by Ilan de Basso.

References
 

1982 births
Living people
MEPs for Sweden 2019–2024
Swedish Ministers for Housing
21st-century Swedish politicians